ReconcilingWorks, initially named Lutherans Concerned for Gay People and subsequently Lutherans Concerned/North America, is an organization of laypeople, pastors, and congregations primarily from the Evangelical Lutheran Church in America (ELCA) and the Evangelical Lutheran Church in Canada (ELCIC) working for the full acceptance and inclusion of people of all sexual orientations and gender identities and expressions in the life of the church. It is one of many LGBT-welcoming church movements to emerge in American Christianity in the late 20th century.

ReconcilingWorks's mission statement reads: "Working at the intersection of oppressions, ReconcilingWorks embodies, inspires, advocates and organizes for the acceptance and full participation of people of all sexual orientations and gender identities within the Lutheran communion and its ecumenical and global partners."

ReconcilingWorks's headquarters is located in the Twin Cities metro area of Minnesota.

Early history
On June 16 and 17, 1974, five people gathered at the invitation of Pastor Jim Siefkes at the University of Minnesota in Minneapolis. Rev. Siefkes, a straight ally, then Director for Discovering Ministries in the American Lutheran Church (ALC), had been given a grant by the ALC to hold a national meeting of homosexual persons and resource persons for the purpose of discussing their sexual orientation and its effect on their relationship with society and the church. The ALC’s purpose was to open a dialogue so that the church would become "less a source of oppression," according to Siefkes.

At that meeting were Allen Blaich (student, University of Utah), Howard Erickson (Minneapolis Star Tribune reporter and contributor to The Advocate), Diane Fraser (assistant professor at Gustavus Adolphus College), Marie Kent (instructor in a Minneapolis home for the mentally challenged) and the Rev. Jim Lokken (American Bible Society, New York).

By the end of the meeting, the group had founded Lutherans Concerned for Gay People (LCGP), run by a steering committee under bylaws typed out ad hoc in twenty minutes by Erickson on a typewriter he found in the next room. The organization’s name was Blaich’s idea. The first two Coordinators were Blaich and Fraser. Marie Kent became the Treasurer. Dues were three dollars. There would be a newsletter, The Gay Lutheran, that Erickson would edit, of which the current quarterly, Concord, is the latter-day descendant.

Shortly thereafter, as the ALC intended, representatives of LCGP found themselves in dialogue with officials in the church. LCGP had an information table and provided hospitality at the ALC Convention in Detroit in October 1974.

And just as quickly, LCGP came under persistent and vociferous attack from conservatives, particularly the Lutheran News run by Herman Otten, founder of the current Christian News. The effect of his attacks was somewhat contrary to his presumed intent, like the proverbial increase of sales resulting from "banning a book in Boston." Membership in LCGP rose partly because of the wide distribution given by Otten’s publication and the fact that he re-published the entire LCGP newsletter in order to foment about it, including the cut-out coupon for joining LCGP.
 
The first logo was the Lutheran Rose, cut from a book by Erickson. The first assembly of LCGP was in 1978. By then, there were twenty-two LCGP chapters across the United States, in places like New England, New York City, Atlanta, New Orleans, Baltimore, San Francisco, Fargo, San Diego and Los Angeles, among others.

At the 1978 LCGP Assembly the decision was made to shorten the name to Lutherans Concerned because, among other reasons, some thought the longer name was cumbersome. Late in 1978, the United States Post Office granted non-profit status to Lutherans Concerned.

The name of the organization was further changed in 1980 to Lutherans Concerned/North America (LC/NA), to make visible the continental reach Lutherans Concerned had achieved through its programs and influence. The shortened name, Lutherans Concerned, continued to be used as the working name except in more formal documents and press releases.

The 1980 name change reflected the international nature of the organization, with members, chapters and movement building within the Evangelical Lutheran Church in Canada (ELCIC). Lutherans Concerned in Canada (LCIC) is independently led, with its own board and officers, and also, continuing to the present, voting representation on the main board of ReconcilingWorks.

The "fish" logo was created by Steve Broin and adopted by LC/NA in 1982 to replace the Lutheran rose. Elements of this logo are incorporated in the current logo of ReconcilingWorks. Steve also created the logo for the RIC program.

In 1983, the Internal Revenue Service recognized LC/NA as a Section 501(c)(3) non-profit organization.

ELCA social statement 2009, "Human Sexuality, Gift and Trust" 
A January 2005 report issued by the ELCA's Task Force for ELCA Studies on Sexuality suggests that the group's stance represents a minority position among those who responded to a survey, but one that garners a sizable constituency in support. After collecting opinions from primarily lay members in 2004 (using non-scientific, non-random sampling methods), the Task Force concluded that "a majority of the respondents to the study do not wish to change our traditional position," while noting that "a significant minority wants us to either 1) bless same-sex unions and admit people in such unions into the rostered ministries of the ELCA or 2) allow for pastoral discretion in the blessing of same-sex unions and make an accommodation by allowing for some form of exception or local option to admit people in such unions to the rostered ministries of the ELCA."

Out of approximately 4,000 respondents, 57 percent opposed blessing and rostering, 22.1 percent favored blessing and rostering, and 20.8 percent favored either an (unspecified) alternative, a delay in decision, or expressed no opinion. The results varied widely by age: younger respondents were more likely than older respondents to support blessing and rostering, with 42.7 percent in favor and 27 percent opposed among respondents 24 and under, and 17.7 percent in favor and 65.5 percent opposed among respondents age 65 or older. The approximately 4,000 respondents represented 0.08 percent of the total population of the ELCA, which stood at about 4.8 million at the time of the survey.

History 2000–2012 
At the ELCA's churchwide assembly held in Chicago in August 2007, about 44% of the assembly's voting members voted to consider a resolution calling for the ELCA to revise its policies to allow for the rostering of ministers in same-gender relationships.

On June 12, 2012, Lutherans Concerned/North America changed its name to ReconcilingWorks.

Reconciling in Christ program 
Through its Reconciling in Christ (RIC) program, the organization recognizes congregations and Lutheran organizations that declare themselves welcoming to all people, regardless of sexual orientation or gender identity. As of January 2023, the RIC roster exceeds 1,002 settings, including congregations, synods, campus ministries, colleges, and other organizations, in the ELCA, ELCIC, and independent Lutheran.

See also

LGBT-welcoming church programs

References

Further reading

External links
 Official website
 Lutherans Concerned in Canada

Lutheran organizations
LGBT Christian organizations